Toledo most commonly refers to:

 Toledo, Spain, a city in Spain
 Province of Toledo, Spain
 Toledo, Ohio, a city in the United States

Toledo may also refer to:

Places

Belize 
 Toledo District
 Toledo Settlement

Bolivia 
 Toledo, Oruro

Brazil 
 Toledo, Minas Gerais
 Toledo, Paraná

Colombia 
 Toledo, Norte de Santander
 Toledo, Antioquia

Philippines 
 Toledo, Cebu

Spain 
 Taifa of Toledo (1010–1085)
 Kingdom of Toledo (1085–1833)
 Province of Toledo, Spain
 Roman Catholic Archdiocese of Toledo
 Toledo (Congress of Deputies constituency)

United States 
 Toledo, Georgia, an unincorporated community
 Toledo, Illinois, a village
 Toledo, Iowa, a city
 Toledo, Kansas, an unincorporated community
 Toledo, Callaway County, Missouri, an unincorporated community
 Toledo, Ohio, a city
 Toledo, Ozark County, Missouri, an unincorporated community
 Toledo, Oregon, a city
 Toledo, Washington, a city
 Toledo, Texas, an unincorporated community in Fayette County, Texas

Uruguay 
 Toledo, Uruguay

Ships
 USS Toledo (PF-33), a patrol frigate that was renamed USS Dearborn in 1943
 USS Toledo (CA-133), a Baltimore-class heavy cruiser of the United States Navy active during the Korean War
 USS Toledo (SSN-769), a Los Angeles-class submarine still in service as of 2012

Other uses 
 Toledo (surname), a surname (including a list of people with the name)
 University of Toledo, a university in Ohio
 Toledo Rockets, the university's athletics teams
 Mettler Toledo or Toledo Scale Company
 SEAT Toledo, a compact automobile by Spanish automaker SEAT
 Toledo (air defense system), an air defense system consisting of Skyguard components including Aspide launchers, but with a Skydor fire control unit from Navantia
 Triumph Toledo, a (defunct) compact automobile by British Leyland
 Toledo (Naples Metro), a station on Line 1 of the Naples Metro
 Toledo Records, an American record label named after Toledo, Ohio

See also 

 Pedro de Toledo, São Paulo
 Toledano
 Toledo Chico, a neighborhood in Montevideo
 Toledo Strip, an Ohio/Michigan border region, disputed in the 1830s Toledo War